Billingham is a railway station on the Durham Coast Line, which runs between Newcastle and Middlesbrough via Hartlepool. It is owned by Network Rail and managed by Northern Trains.

History

The station is a modern-style halt on the line and was opened on Monday 7 November 1966 to replace the town's original grander station located further west towards Norton; this closed the previous day and was subsequently demolished in the early 1970s. It was located to the west of the junction between the Durham Coast Line and the earlier Port Clarence Branch of the Clarence Railway, adjacent to the level crossing carrying the old route of the A19 across the railway. Only the signal box and footbridge survive on the site of the original station.

The new Billingham station, built by the Eastern Region of British Rail, was provided with a booking hall, waiting room, parcels office and lavatories. These facilities were lost when the station was reduced to unstaffed halt status towards the end of the 1960s. The station building of 1966 still stands, and was used as the office of local taxi company Binks Taxis, but is now unoccupied.

The Tees Valley Rail Strategy calls for the re-opening of the original station as 'Old Billingham' as a new additional station on the Durham Coast Line. However, the plans have yet to come to fruition.

Accidents and incidents
On 2 December 1953, a train ran off the end of the loop and was derailed. An express freight train then ran into the wreckage, and was also derailed.

Facilities
The station is unstaffed but has a ticket machine. New fully lit waiting shelters, digital information screens and CCTV cameras have been installed here whilst the long-line public address system (PA) has been renewed and upgraded with pre-recorded train announcements; train running information can also be obtained by telephone, a customer help point and timetable poster boards.  The only access to the island platform is via a stepped footbridge, so it is not accessible for wheelchair or mobility-impaired passengers.

Services

As of the May 2021 timetable change, the station is served by an hourly service between Newcastle and Middlesbrough. Most trains continue to Hexham (or Carlisle on Sunday) and Nunthorpe. Two trains per day (three on Sunday) continue to Whitby. Two trains operate between Hartlepool and Darlington on Sunday. All services are operated by Northern Trains.

Rolling stock used: Class 156 Super Sprinter and Class 158 Express Sprinter

References

External links
 
 

Railway stations in the Borough of Stockton-on-Tees
DfT Category F2 stations
Railway stations opened by British Rail
Railway stations in Great Britain opened in 1966
Northern franchise railway stations
Billingham